Denver Edward Beanland  (born 26 January 1945) is a former politician in Queensland, Australia. He was a Member of the Queensland Legislative Assembly and leader of the Queensland Liberal Party.

Early life
Denver Edward Beanland was born on 26 January 1945 at St Margaret's Private Hospital, Kilcoy, Queensland, the only son of Norman Edward Beanland and his wife Gwendoline (née Runge). The family lived a dairy farm called Avondale (originally owned by Beanland's grandfather Herbert Beanland) located at Mary Smokes Creek, between Kilcoy and Woodford.

Beanland attended the Kalangara State School at Stoney Creek, four miles from his home. He continued his secondary education at Caboolture State High School.

Local politics
Beanland was elected as an Alderman of the Brisbane City Council in 1976 and served on that Council, including a period as Deputy Lord Mayor of Brisbane until 1986.

State politics
In 1986, Beanland was elected to the Legislative Assembly of Queensland, in 1986, as the member for Toowong. He represented Toowong until 1992, at which time it was renamed Indooroopilly.

Beanland was leader of the Liberal Party in the Queensland Parliament from May 1990 until November 1991, when he was ousted by Joan Sheldon. Although he did not return to the Liberal leadership, he became deputy leader in 1995.

Denver Beanland served as Attorney-General in the Borbidge government from February 1996 to 20 June 1998. He also served as Opposition Spokesperson, prior to 1996, for a number of portfolios including Justice, Transport and Land Management. 

In 1997 a vote of no-confidence was passed against him as Attorney-General over his role in the Carruthers and Connolly-Ryan Inquiries.  In an unprecedented decision he refused to resign in the wake of the no-confidence vote, citing his lack of personal responsibility for the scandal. 

He was supported by Premier Rob Borbidge who says he decides who is in his Cabinet not Parliament.

He lost his seat of Indooroopilly at the 2001 state election.

Later life
After leaving politics, Beanland studied at the University of Queensland, completing a Bachelor of Arts and Doctor of Philosophy in history in 2007. The topic of his PhD thesis was former Queensland Premier Thomas McIlwraith.

Denver Beanland has been the President of the Royal Historical Society of Queensland since 2020 after having previously been its President from 2007 to 2009. In 2019 he was elected a Fellow of the Society.

In 2015 Beanland was appointed by the Abbott Government to chair the National Archives Advisory Council.

On 7 June 2020, Beanland was appointed a Member of the Order of Australia (AM) for significant service to the people and Parliament of Queensland, and to archival and historical organisations.

Publications

References

1945 births
Living people
Liberal Party of Australia members of the Parliament of Queensland
Members of the Queensland Legislative Assembly
Members of the Order of Australia
People from Brisbane
Delegates to the Australian Constitutional Convention 1998
20th-century Australian politicians
Attorneys-General of Queensland
21st-century Australian politicians